Piotrawin  is a village in the administrative district of Gmina Jastków, which is located in Lublin County of Lublin Voivodeship in eastern Poland.

References

Villages in Lublin County